Pudukkudi West is a village near Srivaikuntam, Thoothukudi district in Tamil Nadu, India. More than 75 families live in the village. The Railway station for Srivaikuntam is in Pudukkudi.

Chendur Express, the weekly express in Tamil Nadu that connects south to North of Tamil Nadu holds at Pudukkudi West.

Villages in Thoothukudi district